Faranah (N’ko: ߝߙߊߣߊ߫߫) is a town and sub-prefecture in central Guinea, lying by the River Niger. As of 2014 it had a population of 78,108 people. The town is mainly inhabited by the Malinke people.

History 
Sékou Touré was born in what was then a village, and after becoming president developed it with a mosque, palace and conference centre.  It lies immediately south west of the Haut Niger National Park.  The town is served by Faranah Airport.

Climate
Faranah has a tropical savanna climate (Köppen climate classification Aw).

Mining 
Faranah is near major iron ore deposits.

Notable residents 
Mamadou Barry - Olympic Guinean long-distance runner
Singer Sayon Camara, artist of Dinuiraye

References 

Regional capitals in Guinea
Sub-prefectures of the Faranah Region